The Nanjing–Luoyang Expressway, designated as G36 and commonly referred to as the Ningluo Expressway is an expressway that connects the cities of Nanjing, Jiangsu, China, and Luoyang, Henan.

The expressway was fully completed on 30 September 2006. It passes through the following cities:
 Nanjing, Jiangsu
 Bengbu, Anhui
 Fuyang, Anhui
 Zhoukou, Henan
 Pingdingshan, Henan
 Luoyang, Henan

References

Transport in Nanjing
Bengbu
Fuyang
Transport in Luoyang
Chinese national-level expressways
Expressways in Jiangsu
Expressways in Anhui
Expressways in Henan